Selle San Marco was an Italian professional cycling team that existed from 1981 to 1982. It was the predecessor to the Dromedario cycling team.

The team competed in the 1981 and 1982 Giro d'Italia.

Major wins
1981
 Giro della Provincia di Reggio Calabria, Alfio Vandi
 Coppa Placci, Alfio Vandi

References

Defunct cycling teams based in Italy
1981 establishments in Italy
1982 disestablishments in Italy
Cycling teams established in 1981
Cycling teams disestablished in 1982